Miss Rose White is a  television film adaptation by Anna Sandor of the 1985 Barbara Lebow play, A Shayna Maidel, starring Kyra Sedgwick. It first aired on April 26, 1992. The production received five Emmy Awards, including Outstanding Television Movie and Outstanding Supporting Actress in a Television Movie (Amanda Plummer), as well as the Humanitas Prize in the 90 minute category.

Synopsis
Rose White (Sedgwick) is a modern young career woman in post-World War II New York City who has largely relegated her Jewish heritage to scrapbooks and memories. Born in Poland but fortunate enough to escape the country before the Nazi occupation and the Holocaust wiped out her family, Rose is stunned to learn her older sister, Lusia, somehow survived the horror and is coming to America. The sisters' reunion is complicated by Lusia's (Amanda Plummer) memories of her struggles to survive and the revelation of past family secrets.

Cast
 Maureen Stapleton – Tanta Perla
 Kyra Sedgwick – Reyzel Weiss/Rose White
 Maximilian Schell – Mordecai Weiss
 Amanda Plummer – Lusia
 Penny Fuller – Miss Kate Ryan
 D. B. Sweeney – Dan McKay
 Gina Gershon – Angie
 Milton Selzer – Uncle Shimon

Awards
44th Primetime Emmy Awards
Winner for:
 Outstanding Television Movie
 Outstanding Supporting Actress in a Limited Series or Movie (Plummer)
 Outstanding Directing for a Limited Series, Movie, or Dramatic Special
 Outstanding Hairstyling for a Miniseries or a Special

Also nominated:
 Outstanding Lead Actor in a Limited Series or Movie (Schell)
 Outstanding Supporting Actress in a Limited Series or Movie (Fuller)
 Outstanding Supporting Actress in a Limited Series or Movie (Stapleton)
 Outstanding Writing for a Limited Series, Movie, or Dramatic Special
 Outstanding Cinematography for a Limited Series or Movie
 Outstanding Individual Achievement in Art Direction for a Miniseries or a Special

19th Humanitas Awards in the category of 90 Minute or Longer Network or Syndicated Television

References

External links
 
 

1992 drama films
Hallmark Hall of Fame episodes
Television shows based on plays
1992 television films
1992 films
Primetime Emmy Award for Outstanding Made for Television Movie winners
Films directed by Joseph Sargent
Films scored by Billy Goldenberg
American drama television films
1990s English-language films
1990s American films